Chanpatia Assembly constituency is an assembly constituency in Paschim Champaran district in the Indian state of Bihar.

Overview
As per orders of Delimitation of Parliamentary and Assembly constituencies Order, 2008, 7. Chanpatia Assembly constituency is composed of the following:
Chanpatia community development block; and Chanayan Bandh, Mahana Gani, Ratanmala, Sarisawa, Barawa Semaraghat, Harpur Garawa, Dumari, Mahanwa Rampurwa, Dhokarahan, Baithania Bhanachak and Nautan Khurd gram panchayats of Majhaulia CD Block.

Chanpatia Assembly constituency is part of 2. Paschim Champaran (Lok Sabha constituency). It was earlier part of Bettiah (Lok Sabha constituency).

Members of Legislative Assembly

Election results

2020

2015

2010

References

External links
 

Assembly constituencies of Bihar
Politics of West Champaran district